Masoud Zeraei (born 31 March 1979) is a Qatari footballer of Iranian descent who currently plays as a goalkeeper.

Career
Zeraei has played for Al Arabi his entire career after being brought to Al Arabi by Dr. Abdullah al-Mal when he was just 16 years old, and has expressed frustration for not being consistently included in the first team over the years.

Zeraei received offers from numerous clubs, notably a 2-year deal from El Jaish SC and an offer from Al Rayyan. He subsequently rejected the offers, claiming his bond with  Dr. Abdullah al-Mal, president of Al Arabi, is a father-son bond and vowed he would remain in Al Arabi if asked to.

Zeraei was available for the Qatar U-23 team in the 2011 GCC Games as one of the overage against UAE in the third place match, as Al Arabi's game against Al Sadd was postponed due to Al Sadd's involvement in the AFC Champions League. However, Qatar lost the game 2-0, and came out fourth place in the competition.

Club career statistics
Statistics accurate as of 22 May 2019

1Includes Emir of Qatar Cup.
2Includes Sheikh Jassem Cup.
3Includes AFC Champions League.

Honours

Club
Al-Arabi
Sheikh Jassem Cup (2): 2008, 2010, 2011

References

External links
QATAR STARS LEAGUE - QSL.com.qa
Alarabi Sports Club - Masoud Zeraei

1979 births
Living people
People from Borazjan
Iranian footballers
Qatari footballers
Al-Arabi SC (Qatar) players
Qatari people of Iranian descent
Qatar Stars League players
Naturalised citizens of Qatar
Association football goalkeepers